Pakola, derived from Pakistan-Cola, is flavored carbonated soft drink from Pakistan.

History
Pakola was the creation of seven brothers from the Teli family of Dhoraji in India who migrated to Pakistan in 1947. The idea of Pakola came from its founder Haji Ali Mohammad, who dreamed of developing a drink that portrayed the true reflection and taste of Pakistan.

The drink was launched at Pakistan Air Force Base on the anniversary of Pakistan's Independence, 14 August 1950, in the presence of the first Prime Minister, Liaquat Ali Khan.

In the early 1960s, people started mixing Pakola with chilled milk and started serving it to jugs during the communal 'iftars' during the month of Ramadan. This helped increase its consumption and popularity.

Later when Pakistan Beverages (PB) came into existence at SITE Karachi, the brand Pakola was produced there. In 1979, when Pakistan Beverages was announced as a production facility for Pepsi, Mehran Bottlers came into existence and continued to produce the drink along with other products such as Apple Sidra and Bubble Up.

Mehran Bottlers was managed by his nephews Zafar Habib and Arif Habib. In 2004, Mehran Bottlers and Pakistan Beverages started manufacturing cans in Pakistan. 

In 2004, Zeeshan Z. Habib took charge as the chief executive officer of Mehran Bottlers.

Varieties
Several of the variants that have been introduced by Pakola:

Pakola Ice Cream Soda (1950)
Pakola Orange (1985)
Pakola Raspberry (1985)
Pakola Lychee (1991)
Pakola Fresh Lime (2006)
Pakola Water (2015)
Pakola Pomegranate (2016)
Pakola Vimto
Apple Sidra
Forest (Club Soda)

Ingredients 
Pakola is made with carbonated water, sugar, citric acid, cream soda artificial flavor, Color: FD&C Bleu No 1 (E 133), FD&C Yellow No.5 (E 102), and sodium benzoate. A typical can of Pakola (8.5 fl ounces/250 ml) has 33 g of sugar, 15 mg of sodium, 0 g of cholesterol, 0 g fat, 0 g of protein, and 130 calories.

Production
Pakola is currently produced by Mehran Bottlers.

Distribution
Pakola is now available in America, Africa, Australia, Canada, Middle East, New Zealand and the United Kingdom. It is the only carbonated beverage manufactured in Pakistan that is exported globally.

Glass bottles
Due to the introduction of the capacity tax in 2013, Pakola discontinued the production and distribution of all glass-bottled products. The tax was levied on the overall production and distribution of the machinery instead of output, which was detrimental for companies with lower productions or smaller markets. After the collapse of this system, Mehran Bottlers quickly set up their PET lines to grasp the market once again.

References

External links
Pakola website

Drink companies of Pakistan
Pakistani drinks
Products introduced in 1950
Cream sodas
Pakistani brands